Neecha Nagar is a 1946 Indian Hindi-language film, directed by Chetan Anand, written by Khwaja Ahmad Abbas and Hayatullah Ansari, and produced by Rashid Anwar and A.Halim. It was a pioneering effort in social realism in Indian cinema and paved the way for many such parallel cinema films by other directors, many of them also written by Khwaja Ahmad Abbas. It starred Chetan Anand's wife Uma Anand, with Rafiq Anwar, Kamini Kaushal, Murad, Rafi Peer, Hamid Butt, and Zohra Sehgal. Neecha Nagar (Lowly City) was a Hindi film adaptation in an Indian setting of Maxim Gorky's 1902 play The Lower Depths.

Neecha Nagar became the first Indian film to gain recognition at the Cannes Film Festival, after it shared the Grand Prix du Festival International du Film (Best Film) award at the first Cannes Film Festival in 1946 with eleven of the eighteen entered feature films. It's the only Indian film to be ever awarded a Palme d'Or. Ironically, this film was never released in India.

Overview
It was based on a Hindi story, Neecha Nagar, written by Hayatullah Ansari, which in turn was inspired by Russian writer Maxim Gorky’s The Lower Depths. It took an expressionist look at the gulf between the rich and poor in society.

Neecha Nagar is the debut film of actress Kamini Kaushal and for Ravi Shankar as a music director.

Cast
 Rafiq Anwar as Balraj
 Uma Anand as Maya
 Kamini Kaushal as Rupa
 Murad as Hakim Yaqub Khan Sahab
 Rafi Peer as Sarkar
 S.P. Bhatia as Sagar
 Hamid Butt as Yaqoob Chacha
 Mohan Saigal as Raza
 Zohra Sehgal as Bhabi
 B. M. Vyas as Balraj's brother

Soundtrack

The music of the film was composed by Ravi Shankar with lyrics by Mammohan Anand and Vishwamitra Adil.

"Utho Ke Hame Waqt Ki Gardish" - chorus
"Kab Tak Gahri Raat Rahegi" - Lakshmi Shankar 
"Birha Ki Aag" - Geeta Dutt
"Dil Mein Samaake" - N/A
"Ek Nirali Jyot Bujhi Hai" - N/A
"Haiya Ho Haiya" - N/A
"Hum Rukenge Bhi Nahi" - N/A
"So Na O Nanhi" - Lakshmi Shankar

Awards
1946 Cannes Film Festival
Grand Prix du Festival International du Film

Citations

References
 Neecha Nagar at the New York Times
 Remembering Chetan Anand and Neecha Nagar, Hindustan Times, 29 September 2007

External links
 
 Neecha Nagar on YouTube

1946 films
1940s Hindi-language films
Palme d'Or winners
Films based on works by Maxim Gorky
Films directed by Chetan Anand
Social realism in film
Films about poverty in India
Films scored by Ravi Shankar
Films with screenplays by Khwaja Ahmad Abbas
Indian drama films
1946 drama films
Indian black-and-white films
Hindi-language drama films